The following is a list of award recipients of Premier Volleyball League, a collegiate women's volleyball league in the Philippines founded in 2004 (as Shakey's V-League).

Awards

Most Valuable Player

Best Outside Spiker

Best Middle Blocker

Best Opposite Spiker

Best Setter

Best Libero

Best Foreign Guest Player

Highest scorer in a match

See also 
Spikers' Turf award recipients

References 

Lists of volleyball players
Volleyball awards